Scruffy is a 1938 British family film directed by Randall Faye and starring Jack Melford, Billy Merson and Peter Gawthorne. The screenplay involves a young boy who runs away from his wealthy home because his mother does not like his dog, and ends up living with a burglar.

Cast
 Jack Melford - Jim 
 Billy Merson - Golly 
 Toni Edgar-Bruce - Mrs. Pottinger 
 Michael Gainsborough - Michael 
 MacArthur Gordon - Hoskins 
 Chris McMaster - Adam 
 Peter Gawthorne - Chairman 
 Joan Ponsford - Judy
 Roddy McDowall (age 10) uncredited - Befriended boy

References

External links

1938 films
Films directed by Randall Faye
British black-and-white films
British drama films
1938 drama films
1930s English-language films
1930s British films